"Call It What You Want" is a song recorded by American singer-songwriter Taylor Swift for her sixth studio album Reputation (2017). It was released on November 3, 2017, as a promotional single from the album. Written and produced by Swift and Jack Antonoff, it is a synth-pop, R&B, and trap song. It received critical acclaim upon release.

Release
Swift held several listening parties during October 2017, where she played her sixth studio album Reputation for 100 fans from all around the world. After releasing "Gorgeous" as the first promotional single of the album, on November 2, 2017, Swift announced she would be releasing "Call It What You Want" as the second promotional single from Reputation, while posting teasers on her official Twitter and Instagram accounts. The track was released at midnight on November 3, 2017 along with a lyric video on YouTube. The song was engineered by Laura Sisk at Rough Customer Studio in Brooklyn Heights. It was mixed by Serban Ghenea at MixStar Studios in Virginia Beach, Virginia, and mastered by Randy Merrill at Sterling Sound Studios in New York.

Composition
"Call It What You Want" is an atmospheric synth-pop and R&B-trap song. Jack Antonoff revealed on Twitter that "Call It What You Want" was "made with an MPC, live kick, dx7 strings and samples of Taylor's voice as the intro and throughout. Making her voice into an instrument." He also added that he was "honored to have 'Call It What You Want' out in the world. That song means a great deal to me", and recommend fans to "listen on headphones at night on a walk". "Call It What You Want" also features Swift rapping.

The song is performed in the key of A major in cut time with a tempo of 82 beats per minute. It follows a chord progression of D – A – E – D/F – Fm7, and Swift's vocals span from E3 to C5.

Critical reception
The song received critical acclaim. The song was named the 20th best song of 2017 by Rolling Stone. According to Entertainment Weekly, the song, in which Swift says she is "doing better than [she] ever was" and details her romantic life, was well received by her fan base. Frank Guan of Vulture stated that the song "deals in gossamer and light; its spare, airy production evokes, or attempts to evoke, a sense of radiant, protective romance in the wake of a devastating social debacle; listeners ready to view that loss as the one she suffered last year at the hands of Kim Kardashian and Kanye West will meet no resistance." USA Today gave it a positive review, saying it was more subdued than her other recent singles, and "the most perceptive and unabashedly romantic song of the singer's new era", and "surprisingly effective and grown-up". Complex Magazine had the opinion that the song was the first single pre-released from her album that was not "distressing", as "Call It What You Want" is "actually good," and also dropped the "revenge narrative to great effect."
 Spin Magazine gave it a similar review, saying it was much better than her other recent material.

Commercial performance
Following its release, "Call It What You What" debuted at number 27 on the US Billboard Hot 100 and number one on the Billboard Digital Song Sales charts with 68,000 digital copies. Swift became the first artist to have 15 entries reach the latter's summit and extended her record with most debuts at number one on the chart with 14. It is also the fourth Reputation track to top the chart after "Look What You Made Me Do", "...Ready for It?", and "Gorgeous". In March 13, 2018, the song received a gold certification from the Recording Industry Association of America (RIAA). It charted at number 29 on the UK Singles Chart and was certified silver by the British Phonographic Industry (BPI). In Australia, the song peaked at number 16 on the ARIA Singles Chart and received a gold certification from the Australian Recording Industry Association (ARIA). "Call It What You Want" debuted in single charts, peaking within the top-50 of Austria (43), Hungary (5), Ireland (44), Malaysia (13), New Zealand (34), and the Philippines (27), and further reaching France (76), Germany (99), Portugal (65), and Switzerland (96).

Live performances
Swift performed an acoustic version of "Call It What You Want" during a SiriusXM Fishbowl session on November 10, 2017. A day later, Swift performed an acoustic version of the song again during an episode of the 43rd season of Saturday Night Live, alongside "...Ready for It?". The song was also a regular part of her setlist for the Taylor Swift's Reputation Stadium Tour.

Credits and personnel
Credits are adapted from the liner notes of Reputation.

 Taylor Swift – vocals, songwriter, producer
 Jack Antonoff – producer, songwriter, programming, instruments, background vocals
 Laura Sisk – engineer
 Serban Ghenea – mixing
 John Hanes – mix engineer
 Randy Merrill – mastering

Charts

Certifications

See also
 List of number-one digital songs of 2017 (U.S.)

References

2010s ballads
2017 songs
American synth-pop songs
American contemporary R&B songs
Contemporary R&B ballads
Trap music songs
Songs written by Jack Antonoff
Songs written by Taylor Swift
Taylor Swift songs
Song recordings produced by Jack Antonoff
Song recordings produced by Taylor Swift